Modern Dog is a Thai rock band, formed in 1992. They issued their first album in 1994, selling 500,000 copies. The band has issued five studio albums, selling a total of 2 million copies.

The band's 2004 album, That Song, was produced by Tony Doogan (Belle & Sebastian, Mogwai), with the title track arranged by bassist Yuka Honda of Cibo Matto. The album also featured guest appearances by Yumiko Ohno of Buffalo Daughter and Sean Lennon. It featured three singles that went to No 1 in Thailand.

Extending their reach beyond Thailand, Modern Dog played in Tokyo in 2003. In July–August 2006 the band toured the United States, including a show at the Knitting Factory in New York City.

Members
 Thanachai "Pod" Ujjin – Vocals, rhythm guitar.
 Maetee Noijinda – Guitar
 Pawin "Pong" Suwannacheep – Drums

Past members
 Somath Bunyaratavech – Bass guitars
 Sarawut Loetpanyanut – Keyboards

History
As a college band, Modern Dog won the Coke Music Contest in 1992. It was signed to indie label Bakery Music and was teamed with producer "Suki" Kamol Sukosol Clapp. The first album, Moderndog, was released in 1994. A local station, Fat Radio, which had then just switched to an all-indie format, continuously played the album's first single, Busaba, for 24 hours straight. Another song from the album, ...Before (written by Pathomporn Pathomporn a.k.a. Pry), is featured prominently in the soundtrack to the 2004 Thai film, Citizen Dog.

Because of its electronic experimentation, Modern Dog has been favorably compared to Radiohead, and it actually served as the opening act for the British band in 1994 at a concert in MBK Center in Bangkok.

The band took a four-year break after its second album in 1997, Cafe, with founding bass player, Somath "Bob" Bunyaratanavech, leaving the band, and Pod taking time off to do some business abroad. Dispelling fears that the band had broken up, Modern Dog was back in the studio in 2001 to record its third album, Love Me Love My Life. The band then embarked on a national tour, with Bob temporarily rejoining on bass. Since then, the bass-player slot in the band has been filled by a rotating roster of players.

Modern Dog has since been hailed as the leader of Thailand's indie and rock music scene, paving the way for such bands as Loso, Big Ass, Bodyslam and Silly Fools. After more than 10 years with Bakery Music (which was sold to Sony BMG Music Entertainment in 2001), Modern Dog has left the label and plans to release albums on its own label.

Along with its appearances in the United States in 2006, Modern Dog performed on July 28–30 in the Lincoln Center for the Performing Arts production of a rock opera adaptation of the Ramakien national epic, along with Sek Loso and other Thai artists.

In October 2006, in appearances at music festivals in Bangkok, the band unveiled new songs for a forthcoming album. Their fifth album, Ting Nong Noy was released in September 2008 under its own label Moderndog Co., Ltd.

The band recently announced a short tour of Thailand and Malaysia commencing in early October 2017 with Paul Tillotson (London, England) replacing Somath Bunyartanavech on drums due to the latter's illness. Paul Tillotson has toured previously with Sek Loso and his band.

In May 2020 the band announced that they are on hiatus.

Discography

Studio albums

Discography

Moderndog-Soem Sukhaphap
Released April 10, 1994

Cafe
Released February 2, 1997

Love Me Love My Life
Released July 26, 2001

That Song
Released: October 12, 2004

Ting Nong Noy
Released: September 9, 2008

Live albums, DVDs and compilations

The Very Common of Moderndogcumentary
Live concert album released March 28, 2003

The Very Common of Moderndogcumentary
Live concert DVD released September 2004

Hit You – Ultimate Collection
Compilation released in 2005

Wake Up At Ten
Live concert DVD/VCD released October 28, 2005, from 10th anniversary concert on May 21, 2005 at Huamak Indoor Stadium, Bang Kapi.

Singles

References

External links
 Modern Dog at MySpace

Thai rock music groups
Musical groups established in 1992
Musical groups from Bangkok